A Matter of WHO is a 1961 British comedy thriller film directed by Don Chaffey and starring Terry-Thomas as a World Health Organization employee trying to trail the source of a deadly virus. It also featured Julie Alexander, Sonja Ziemann, Alex Nicol, Richard Briers, Honor Blackman and Carol White.

It was made at MGM-British Elstree Studios with sets designed by Elliot Scott. MGM records say it lost $142,000.

Plot
Aboard an airliner flying from Nice to London, an oil driller returning from the Middle East named Cooper becomes very ill. This attracts the notice of World Health Organization self-styled "germ detective" Archibald Bannister. It turns out that Cooper's new wife, Michèle, and his business associate, Kennedy, know each other.

Bannister is reprimanded by his boss, Hatfield, for previously shutting down London Airport because of what turns out to be an ordinary rat. This time, however, Cooper is diagnosed with highly infectious smallpox. There are also outbreaks in Brussels and Zurich. Bannister suspects that all three cases were contracted from a fourth person, a carrier.

Cast

 Terry-Thomas as Archibald Bannister
 Sonja Ziemann as Michèle
 Alex Nicol as Kennedy
 Richard Briers as Jamierson
 Honor Blackman as Sister Bryan
 Carol White as Beryl
 Guy Deghy as Ivanovitch
 Clive Morton as Hatfield
 Martin Benson as Rahman
 Geoffrey Keen as Foster
 The John Barry Seven
 Eduard Linkers as Linkers
 Vincent Ball as Dr Blake
 Michael Ripper as Skipper
 Cyril Wheeler as Cooper
 Andrew Faulds as Ralph
 George Cormack as Henry
 Bruce Beeby as Captain Brooke
 Julie Alexander as Stewardess
 Barbara Hicks as Margery

References

External links 

1961 films
1960s comedy mystery films
1960s comedy thriller films
British comedy mystery films
British comedy thriller films
1960s English-language films
Films directed by Don Chaffey
Films set in London
Films set in Switzerland
Metro-Goldwyn-Mayer films
1961 comedy films
Films shot at MGM-British Studios
1960s British films